The Andean leaf-eared mouse (Phyllotis andium) is a species of rodent in the family Cricetidae.
It is found in Ecuador and Peru.

References

 Baillie, J. 1996.  Phyllotis andium.   2006 IUCN Red List of Threatened Species.   Downloaded on 9 July 2007.
Musser, G. G. and M. D. Carleton. 2005. Superfamily Muroidea. pp. 894–1531 in Mammal Species of the World a Taxonomic and Geographic Reference. D. E. Wilson and D. M. Reeder eds. Johns Hopkins University Press, Baltimore.

Mammals described in 1912
Taxa named by Oldfield Thomas
Phyllotis
Taxonomy articles created by Polbot